Micheal Oluwaseun Eric (born June 24, 1988) is a Nigerian professional basketball player for Türk Telekom of the Turkish Basketbol Süper Ligi (BSL). He played college basketball for Temple.

Early life
Born and raised in Lagos, Nigeria, Eric did not play basketball as a youth as his dad was a soccer coach and he liked to focus on his education. Despite basketball being a popular sport in Nigeria, he dismissed the sport until he grew five inches in a span of two years. He traveled to Delaware in 2004 to visit his brother, Stephen, who wouldn’t let him return to Nigeria. Stephen knew with his younger brother's height – he was 6-foot-8 at the time – he could make a future for himself in basketball. Newly arrived in the United States, Eric enrolled at Caesar Rodney High School in Camden, Delaware where he spent his sophomore year before transferring to Church Farm School in Exton, Pennsylvania for his junior year.

High school career
Eric played two seasons at Church Farm as he earned first-team all-league and all-area as a junior and senior. As a junior in 2005–06, he averaged 16 points, 15 rebounds and eight blocks per game.

In November 2006, Eric signed a National Letter of Intent to play college basketball for Temple University.

As a senior in 2006–07, Eric averaged 19 points, 14 rebounds and four blocks per game while leading Church Farm to the KASC regular season championship.

College career
To Eric's disappointment, he was ruled ineligible to compete in 2007–08 due to NCAA initial eligibility guidelines, forcing him to redshirt the season. He went on to join the Temple Owls in 2008–09 where he averaged 2.7 points and 2.1 rebounds in 27 games.

As a sophomore in 2009–10, Eric played in 31 games, starting 29, as he finished fifth on the team in scoring with 5.9 points per game. In addition, his 20 blocks and .516 field goal percentage ranked second on the team. He also averaged 7.0 rebounds and 3.0 assists in just 15.7 minutes per game.

As a junior in 2010–11, Eric was named the team co-captain. He started the first 24 games of season before fracturing his right patella in practice which sidelined him for remainder of season. he averaged 7.1 points and 1.6 blocks, as well as ranking second on team with 5.9 rebounds per game and third with .490 field goal percentage.

As a senior in 2011–12, Eric again missed significant time with another right patella fracture, sitting out all of December and most of January with the injury. He played in 19 games, starting 15 times, as he was first on the team in rebounding (8.8 rpg) and fifth on the team in scoring (9.0 ppg). He tied his career-high with 19 points and a game-high 15 rebounds against UMass on February 29, 2012.

Professional career
After going undrafted in the 2012 NBA draft, Eric joined the Cleveland Cavaliers for the 2012 NBA Summer League. On August 10, 2012, he signed with the Cavaliers but was later waived on October 27, 2012. In November 2012, he was acquired by the Canton Charge of the NBA Development League as an affiliate player.

In July 2013, Eric joined the Philadelphia 76ers for the Orlando Summer League and the Golden State Warriors for the Las Vegas Summer League. On November 1, 2013, he was reacquired by the Canton Charge. Three days later, he was traded to the Texas Legends. On January 15, 2014, he was waived by the Legends due to a season-ending injury.

On September 27, 2014, Eric signed with the Milwaukee Bucks. However, he was later waived by the Bucks on October 27, 2014. On December 4, 2014, he signed with Panelefsiniakos of the Greek Basket League and made his debut for the team on December 13. However, the next day, he signed with Enel Brindisi of Italy for the rest of the 2014–15 season, replacing Cedric Simmons in the line-up after the forward suffered a season-ending knee injury.

In July 2015, Eric joined the Milwaukee Bucks for the 2015 NBA Summer League. On October 31, Eric returned to the Texas Legends. He was waived by the Legends on November 11, and reacquired on November 20. On January 29, 2016, he was named in the West All-Star team for the 2016 NBA D-League All-Star Game. At the season's end, he earned NBA D-League All-Defensive Team honors. On April 5, 2016, Eric signed with AEK Athens of Greece for the rest of the 2015–16 Greek Basket League season.

In July 2016, Eric joined the Washington Wizards for the 2016 NBA Summer League. On August 7, 2016, he signed with Bilbao Basket of Spain for the 2016–17 season.

On July 18, 2017, Eric signed with the Turkish club Darüşşafaka for the 2017–18 season.

On July 9, 2019, Eric signed a two-year deal with Spanish club Kirolbet Baskonia. He averaged 7 points and 3.6 rebounds per game. On July 7, 2020, Eric parted ways with the team. He signed with Türk Telekom of the Turkish Super League on July 15.

On February 10, 2021, Eric signed with CSKA Moscow of the VTB United League and the EuroLeague for the rest of the 2020–21 season. On June 16, 2021, Eric officially parted ways with the Russian club.

On August 9, 2021, he has signed with Unicaja Málaga of the Spanish Liga ACB. Eric suffered a season-ending ruptured ACL injury on January 26, 2022.

On January 13, 2023, he signed with Türk Telekom of the Turkish Basketbol Süper Ligi (BSL).

Career statistics

EuroLeague

|-
| style="text-align:left;"| 2018–19
| style="text-align:left;"| Darüşşafaka
| 29 || 20 || 20.1 || .540 || .000 || .656 || 5.0 || 0.9 || 0.3 || 0.6 || 11.1 || 10.4
|-
| style="text-align:left;"| 2019–20
| style="text-align:left;"| Baskonia
| 28 || 22 || 14.5 || .552 || .000 || .457 || 2.7 || 0.3 || 0.8 || 0.4 || 5.7 || 4.4
|-
| style="text-align:left;"| 2020–21
| style="text-align:left;"| CSKA Moscow
| 14 || 9 || 12.2 || .700 || .000 || .700 || 3.3 || 0.2 || 0.6 || 0.5 || 5.4 || 6.4

References

External links
FIBA profile
Temple bio

1988 births
Living people
21st-century Nigerian people
AEK B.C. players
Baloncesto Málaga players
Bilbao Basket players
Canton Charge players
Centers (basketball)
Darüşşafaka Basketbol players
Liga ACB players
New Basket Brindisi players
Nigerian men's basketball players
Nigerian expatriate basketball people in Spain
Nigerian expatriate basketball people in Turkey
Nigerian expatriate basketball people in the United States
Panelefsiniakos B.C. players
PBC CSKA Moscow players
Saski Baskonia players
Sportspeople from Lagos
Temple Owls men's basketball players
Texas Legends players